A by-election was held for the Dewan Rakyat seat of P93 Sungai Besar, a parliamentary seat located in the state of Selangor, Malaysia on 18 June 2016 following the nomination day on 5 June 2016. The seat fell vacant after death of member of parliament Noriah Kasnon, who died in a helicopter crash on May 5, 2016 while campaigning in the Sarawak state election. Noriah Kasnon was also the Plantations Industries and Commodities Deputy Minister. In the 2013 general election, Noriah Kasnon won the seat with a majority of 399 votes beating Mohamed Salleh M Hussin of Pan-Malaysian Islamic Party (PAS). This by-election was held concurrently with the Kuala Kangsar by-election for the same reason.

The Barisan Nasional candidate was Budiman Mohd Zohdi from United Malays National Organisation (UMNO) who is also the Sungai Panjang state assemblyman. The PAS candidate is Abdul Rani Osman who is also the state assemblyman for Meru. The opposition coalition Pakatan Harapan has chosen Azhar Abdul Shukor from the National Trust Party (AMANAH) as its candidate.

Some of the issues that will be brought up during the by-election campaign are the Goods and Services tax, the rising cost of living and electricity tariffs.

Results 
Budiman Mohd Zohdi retained the seat for Barisan Nasional with a majority 9,191 votes beating both candidates from Amanah and PAS.

References 

Politics of Selangor
2016 elections in Malaysia
2016 Sungai Besar by-election
Elections in Selangor